The Riverfront Streetcar Line is a historic streetcar line in New Orleans, Louisiana.   It is operated by the New Orleans Regional Transit Authority (RTA).  It was built along the east bank of the Mississippi River, in an area with many amenities catering to tourists. It opened August 14, 1988, making it the first new streetcar route in New Orleans in 62 years. The line runs  from Julia Street at the upper end of the New Orleans Convention Center to the downriver (far) end of the French Quarter at the foot of Esplanade Avenue. Unlike the other three lines, it travels on an exclusive right-of-way, along the river levee beside New Orleans Belt Railway tracks, making it more akin to a light rail line. The line was regauged in 1997 from standard gauge to broad gauge. Officially, the Riverfront Line is designated Route 2 and is designated with a blue color on most RTA publications.

History
Two retired Perley Thomas streetcars, formerly running along the Canal line until 1964, were repurchased and refurbished, along with two W2-type streetcars originally from Melbourne, Australia. It was the city's first streetcar line to offer handicapped access, using the Melbourne cars; the historic landmark status of the Saint Charles route prevented the modification of the cars on that line. 

From the time it opened in 1988, the Riverfront line was originally single-track, with one passing siding. But the line proved to be so popular that this was inadequate, so in 1990, it was temporarily closed and a second track was added. At the same time, another repurchased Perley Thomas streetcar and another ex-Melbourne streetcar were added to the fleet.  The six cars in the fleet were all renumbered into a common series before entering service, with the three original New Orleans (Perley Thomas) cars being numbered 450, 451, and 456 (ex-924, 919, and 952, in that order). The W2-type cars were numbered 452, 454, and 455 for Riverfront service, and were formerly Melbourne cars 626, 478, and 331, respectively.

By 1997, RTA felt the need for additional wheelchair access on the Riverfront line. It was decided to build new streetcars, which would be replicas of the venerable Perley Thomas cars, but would have more modern trucks and controls. The first such car used the body shell of another repurchased Perley Thomas streetcar, number 957 (renumbered 457), with a wheelchair access door cut into its side. Six additional replica car bodies, which became cars 458–463, were built from scratch in the venerable Carrollton Shops. After some experimentation with secondhand PCC trucks and controls salvaged from retired Philadelphia streetcars, initially installed in two cars (457–458), eventually all seven new cars were equipped with trucks and controls from the Czech builder ČKD Tatra.

At the same time, it was decided to regauge the Riverfront line to broad gauge to conform to the St. Charles track gauge, and to build a connecting track on Canal Street from St. Charles to Riverfront. This would make it much easier to service Riverfront cars at Carrollton Station, and they could even be housed at Carrollton rather than out in the open at the ends of the Riverfront line.

The last day of standard gauge operation of Riverfront was September 6, 1997, after which the line was again temporarily closed and the track gauge changed. The three Perley Thomas cars and the three ex-Melbourne cars were retired at this time. The ex-Melbourne cars were sold to the Memphis Area Transit Authority, for use on that city's Main Street Trolley line. One of the Perley Thomas cars was sent to the San Francisco Municipal Railway, and the other two were stored at Carrollton Station. The Riverfront line reopened on December 13, 1997, with the new cars running on the broad-gauge track.

Operation
The Riverfront Streetcar normally operates 24 hours a day.  Frequencies range from 20 minutes 6 a.m. to 10 p.m., to 40 minutes nightly after 10 p.m.

Because of complaints regarding infrequency of service on the Riverfront line, NORTA has installed LCD screens at each of the stops along the route to show approximate incoming times in each direction, as well as an animated display showing destinations and stops in both directions along the line. These times have often proven inaccurate due to fluctuations in the time required to traverse the track length.

Due to construction on the World Trade Center building, service is suspended between Canal Street and the Julia Street end of the Riverfront line.

On October 12, 2019, a building under construction at the corner of Canal Street and N. Rampart Street collapsed, blocking the Canal line (see Hard Rock hotel collapse). For a while, the Riverfront line provided service on Canal Street through the business district, operating from the French Market terminal to Canal Street, then out Canal to Carondelet Street.

Currently, the operable portion of the Riverfront line is combined with the operable portion of the Rampart-St. Claude line as Route 49. From the French Market terminal, it runs to Canal Street, then out Canal to University Place (Loyola Avenue), and out Loyola to the terminal at UPT.

Stop listing
From the French Quarter to the Convention Center area

References

External links

 Riverfront Streetcar line schedule

Passenger rail transportation in Louisiana
Transportation in New Orleans
Light rail in Louisiana
Heritage streetcar systems
New Orleans
1988 establishments in Louisiana
Railway lines opened in 1988